Pacific Fleet may refer to:

 Australian Pacific Fleet, an Australian Royal Navy formation / fleet in the Pacific Ocean
 British Pacific Fleet, a Royal Navy formation which saw action against Japan during the Second World War
 Maritime Forces Pacific, the fleet training and operational readiness division of the Royal Canadian Navy in the Pacific Ocean
 Pacific Fleet (Russia), the Russian Navy fleet in the Pacific Ocean
 Pacific Fleet station, a station of the Blue Line on the San Diego Trolley
 Pacific Naval Force, the Mexican Navy's presence in the Pacific Ocean
 Pacific Reserve Fleet, a United States Navy reserve fleet previously designated the Nineteenth Fleet
 United States Pacific Fleet, a Pacific Ocean theater-level component command of the United States Navy